Tudor Pro Cycling Team is a Swiss professional development road bicycle racing team which participates in the UCI Europe Tour. The team was founded as the Swiss Racing Academy and registered with a UCI Continental licence for the 2019 season.

In April 2022, Swiss former professional cyclist Fabian Cancellara took ownership of the team and partnered with Swiss watch manufacturer Tudor to sponsor the team.

In December 2022, Union Cycliste Internationale announced that Tudor Pro Cycling Team was granted a UCI ProTeam licence for 2023 season.

Team roster

Major results
2019
 Stage 2 Tour du Jura Cycliste, Stefan Bissegger
  Under-23 National Road Race Championships, Mauro Schmid
  Under-23 National Time Trial Championships, Stefan Bissegger
2020
Stage 1 Tour de Savoie Mont-Blanc, Joab Schneiter
2021
 Prologue Tour du Pays de Montbéliard, Alex Vogel
 Giro Ciclistico d'Italia
Stage 6, Aloïs Charrin
Stage 9, Yannis Voisard
2022
 Istrian Spring Trophy
Stage 1, Sean Flynn
Stage 2, Alex Baudin
Stage 3, Robin Froidevaux
 Stage 3 Le Tour de Bretagne Cycliste, Alex Baudin
  Overall Alpes Isère Tour, Yannis Voisard
 Stage 2 Tour du Pays de Montbéliard, Arnaud Tendon
  Under-23 National Time Trial Championships, Fabian Weiss
  National Road Race Championships, Robin Froidevaux
  Under-23 National Road Race Championships, Nils Brun
 Stage 3 Giro della Valle d'Aosta, Alex Baudin
  Under-23 National Road Race Championships, Petr Kelemen

2023
Milano-Torino, Arvid de Kleijn

National Champions
2019
  Switzerland U23 Road Race, Mauro Schmid
  Switzerland U23 Time Trial, Stefan Bissegger
2022
  Switzerland Road Race, Robin Froidevaux
  Switzerland U23 Road Race, Nils Brun
  Switzerland U23 Time Trial, Fabian Weiss 
 Czech Republic U23 Road Race, Petr Kelemen

References

External links

Cycling teams established in 2018
UCI Continental Teams (Europe)
Cycling teams based in Switzerland